Starlight Express may refer to:

 Starlight Express, a 1984 musical by Andrew Lloyd Webber
 "Starlight Express" (song), a song from the musical
The Starlight Express, a 1915 play by Violet Pearn and Algernon Blackwood with music by Edward Elgar.